Cooloolabin Dam is a concrete gravity dam on Rocky Creek located to the west of Yandina in the headwaters of the South Maroochy River waterway.

See also

List of dams and reservoirs in Australia

References

Reservoirs in Queensland
Sunshine Coast, Queensland
Dams in Queensland